The Vietnam Solidarity Campaign (VSC) was originally set up in 1966 by activists around the International Group with the personal and financial support of Bertrand Russell. 

Ralph Schoenman acted both as Director of the Vietnam Solidarity Campaign and as Executive Director of the Bertrand Russell Peace Foundation. Marxist activists including Tariq Ali, Ernie Tate, Al Richardson, David Horowitz, John La Rose and Pat Jordan also played a key role. 

Members of the International Socialists participated in the foundation of the VSC, but for the first year of its existence its presence was a token one only.

It organised a demonstration of 20,000 people in October 1967 that for the first time ignored police warnings not to enter Grosvenor Square, where the United States Embassy in London was then located. In March and October 1968 two major demonstrations in London, sponsored by the VSC, drew more than 100,000 participants. Serious police violence was captured by press and television cameras during the March protest. The October demonstration was carefully planned to avoid any opportunity for a repeat performance, resulting in a peaceful march of 200,000 people across London. According to its newsletter, VSC branches were active in many British cities -- Glasgow, Sheffield, Leeds, Liverpool, Manchester, Nottingham and Swansea. Even small towns, including Falkirk and Northold Park, counted VSC members.

The Vietnam Solidarity Campaign consistently badgered Harold Wilson and his government over Vietnam. Every issue of the VSC Bulletin contained a special section on "British Complicity" in the war, usually focusing on military R&D carried on by industry and universities. In its Vietnam Handbook (1972) the VSC devoted a major chapter to "British Complicity," accusing Wilson of cutting a "shabby figure" as he consistently supported U.S. policy in Vietnam.

References
 Anthony O. Edmonds The Viet Nam War and the British Student Left: A Study in Political Symbolism

Anti–Vietnam War groups